The 2014 IHF Super Globe was the eighth edition. It was held in Doha, Qatar, at the Al-Gharafa Sports Club Hall from 7 to 12 September 2014.

FC Barcelona won the title for the second consecutive time by defeating Al Sadd 34–26 in the final.

Teams
The teams that were taking part were the respectives continental champions:

Draw

Seedings
The seedings were announced on 18 June with the draw being held at 19 June.

Preliminary round

All times are local (UTC+3).

Group A

Group B

Knockout stage

Placement matches
Bracket

5th–8th-place semifinals

5th-place match

7th-place match

Final round
Bracket

Semifinals

Bronze match

Final

Final ranking

References

External links
Official website

IHF Super Globe
2014
IHF Super Globe
IHF Super Globe
2014 IHF Super Globe
2014 IHF Super Globe